Mayahi (var. Mayaki) is a town located in the Maradi Region of Niger. It is the seat of Mayahi Department and a Commune about 45 km from Tessaoua.  In the mid 1990s it had a population of 2,200.  The name "Mayaki" is also a rulers' title among the Sudié and Maouri: local subgroups of the Hausa people.

References

Communes of Maradi Region